Megalophaedusa is a genus of medium-sized air-breathing land snails, terrestrial pulmonate gastropod mollusks in the family Clausiliidae, the door snails, all of which have a clausilium. 

This genus occurs in Japan.

Species
Species within the genus Megalophaedusa include: 

 Megalophaedusa concrescens (Pilsbry 1905)
 Megalophaedusa hickanis mikawa  Pilsbry 1905
 Megalophaedusa hiraseana  (Pilsbry 1901)
 Megalophaedusa martensi  (Von Martens 1860)
 Megalophaedusa martensi tinctilabris  (Pilsbry 1902)
 Megalophaedusa spelaeonis (Kuroda & Minato, 1975)
 Megalophaedusa vasta  Boettger 1877
 Megalophaedusa yokohamensis  (Crosse 1876)

References

 Nomenclator Zoologicus info

Clausiliidae